Nathan Luke West (born September 29, 1978) is an American actor, musician, and singer.

Early life
West was born and raised in Anchorage, Alaska. He graduated from Service High School in Anchorage, where he played hockey.

Career
In 2000 West worked on the television series 7th Heaven with his now wife Chyler Leigh, playing Mary Camden's (Jessica Biel) troubled friends Johnny and Frankie.

West has had roles in major films as well as independent projects, including such films as Disney’s Miracle and the award winning independent feature Alleged. Not only an actor he has also worked as a producer, his projects including IFC’s Brake.

West is also a singer/song writer, drawing his musical inspiration from the likes of Van Morrison, Bob Dylan and Otis Redding.

West also makes music with his wife Chyler Leigh, under the name "WestLeigh". They have performed covers as well as written an original song called "Love Lit The Sky".

Personal life
West played major junior ice hockey with the Detroit Whalers of the Ontario Hockey League.

While at an audition for a couple for the pilot of an unsuccessful WB series titled Saving Graces, West met Chyler Leigh. They have worked on many projects with each other since, usually portraying couples, including 7th Heaven and Safe Harbor. When on the set of Not Another Teen Movie, West proposed to Leigh. The couple married on July 20, 2002, in Alaska. Leigh and West have three children: Noah Wilde West (Born December 2003), Taelyn Leigh West (born September 2006), and Anniston Kae West (born May 7, 2009).

Leigh has said that she and West have a pact in which the person who guesses the baby's sex correctly gets to choose the name. When pregnant with Noah, Leigh guessed she was having a boy so she chose the first name and West gave him his middle name. For Taelyn, West correctly guessed it was a girl, so he named her. Their third child, also a girl, was guessed correctly by West.

West is a Christian. West and his family live in Los Angeles.

Filmography

Film

Television

References

External links
 
 

1978 births
20th-century American male actors
21st-century American male actors
21st-century American singers
21st-century American male singers
American male film actors
American male television actors
American male child actors
American Christians
Christians from Alaska
Living people
Male actors from Anchorage, Alaska
Musicians from Anchorage, Alaska